John Hugh Montague Hare (31 May 1857 – 1 August 1935) was an English first-class cricketer and educator.

The son of Hugh James Hare, he was born in May 1857 at Docking Hall at Docking, Norfolk. He was educated at Uppingham School, before going up Exeter College, Oxford. While studying at Oxford, he played first-class cricket for Oxford University, making his debut against the Gentlemen of England at Oxford in 1879. He played first-class cricket for Oxford until 1880, making a total of eight appearances. In his eight matches, Hare scored a total of 126 runs at an average of 11.45 and with a high score of 38 not out. His county cricket was for Norfolk, for whom he played minor matches for until 1890.

After graduating from Oxford, he became a master at both Winchester College and Eton College. Hare died at Docking Hall in August 1935.

References

External links

1857 births
1935 deaths
People from Docking, Norfolk
People educated at Uppingham School
Alumni of Exeter College, Oxford
English cricketers
Oxford University cricketers
Teachers at Eton College
Schoolteachers from Hampshire